The Sealed Angel is a story by Nikolai Leskov, written in 1872 and first published in the No.1, January 1873 issue of The Russian Messenger. The story concerns a group of Old Believers whose revered icon of an angel is confiscated by officials and sealed with wax.

Background
Nikolai Leskov developed a great interest in the Raskol history and movement in the early 1860s. His attitude towards it changed over time from very cautious to openly appreciative, as he came to see the Old Believers as keepers of old Russian artistic traditions which otherwise would have disappeared without a trace, lacking governmental support. Leskov got interested in the art of icon-painting after having met the iconographer Nikita Racheiskov (d. 1886) whom he commemorated later by the posthumous essay "Of the Artist Man Nikita and Those Brought up by Him".(Novoye vremya, 1886, December 25). It was in Racheiskov's studio that Leskov, while studying Ikonopisny podlinnik (a hand-written manual of icon-painting), wrote The Sealed Angel. The story which came out at the time when the academic studies of icon-painting began, influenced and contributed to the process, according to scholar I. Serman.

Leskov remarked later that The Sealed Angel was his only work that avoided any editorial cuts, explaining this by Mikhail Katkov's men being "too busy to pay much notice". Apparently, there was another reason. The Sealed Angel, being close to a Christmas story in style and form, was warmly received at the Russian Court. Empress consort Maria Alexandrovna and Tsar Alexander II reportedly liked it, which must have kept both editors and censors off.

Finale
The story's finale, where the Old Believers' community all of a sudden return to mainstream Orthodoxy, was criticized as being unnatural. Ten years later Leskov conceded that, while the story itself was mostly based on real facts, the end of it was made up. What happened in reality he revealed in Chapter 41 of The Pechersk Antics set of memoir sketches.

English translations
The Sealed Angel from Russian Sketches, Chiefly of Peasant Life. Translated by Beatrix Tollemache. 
K. A. Lantz (1984) 
David McDuff (1988)
 Richard Pevear and Larissa Volokhonsky (2013)
Donald Rayfield (2020)

Music 

The story became the basis for the 1988 Russian-language choral work The Sealed Angel, by Rodion Shchedrin.

References

External links 
 Запечатленный ангел. The original Russian text. 

1873 books
Works by Nikolai Leskov
Works originally published in The Russian Messenger